Microstegium is a genus of African, Asian, and Pacific Island plants in the sorghum tribe within the grass family. Browntop is a common name.

 Species

 formerly included
see Ischaemum Schizachyrium 
 Microstegium pseudeulalia - Schizachyrium pseudeulalia  
 Microstegium rupestre - Ischaemum polystachyum

References

Andropogoneae
Grasses of Africa
Grasses of Asia
Grasses of Oceania
Grasses of China
Poaceae genera
Taxa named by Christian Gottfried Daniel Nees von Esenbeck